Hamza Rhattas or Hamza Ghatas (born April 8, 1994 in Kenitra) is a Moroccan footballer who plays as forward for KAC Kénitra.

Career statistics

References

External links
Hamza Rhattas at Footballdatabase

1994 births
Living people
Moroccan footballers
Association football forwards
KAC Kénitra players
MC Oujda players
Ittihad Tanger players
Botola players
People from Kenitra